Ingrid J. Parker is a detective/mystery writer. She is best known for creating Sugawara Akitada, who solved crimes in the Heian era of ancient Japan.

Personal life

Ingrid Parker was born and raised in Germany.

She was, until retirement, Associate Professor of English and Foreign Languages at Norfolk State University in Virginia.  Writing detective mysteries set in ancient Japan was an incidental result of initial research into 11th century Japan out of professional interest in Japanese literature of the era. She was also influenced by the Judge Dee mystery series written by the noted orientalist and diplomat Robert van Gulik.

Bibliography

Sugawara Akitada

See Sugawara Akitada for a complete bibliography.

Other works

The Hollow Reed vol. I: Dream of a Spring Night (September 2012, Ingrid J. Parker Inc.)
The Hollow Reed vol. II: Dust Before the Wind (September 2012, Ingrid J. Parker Inc.,)
The Sword Master (October 2013, 2nd edition, CreateSpace Independent Publishing Platform)
The Left-Handed God (December 2013, CreateSpace Independent Publishing Platform)

References

21st-century American novelists
American mystery writers
American historical novelists
American women novelists
Writers of historical mysteries
Living people
Women mystery writers
21st-century American women writers
Women historical novelists
1936 births